Dan Hunter may refer to:

 Dan Hunter (chef), Australian chef
 Dan Hunter (comics), DC comics character
 Dan Hunter (Hollyoaks), Hollyoaks character
 Dan Hunter (musician), founder of The Crownsmen

See also
 Daniel Hunter (disambiguation)